Seeds of Destruction: Hidden Agenda of Genetic Manipulation is a book by F. William Engdahl, an American writer and journalist living in Germany. The book claims that the wealthy Rockefeller family is planning to take control of the world's agriculture and food supply through the Green Revolution and the promotion of genetically modified organisms which would lead to the elimination of independent farms.

Content 

In this book Engdahl presents a conspiracy theory centred around the idea that current descents of the Rockefeller family have developed a plan to take control of the global agricultural system.
 
Engdahl claims that this plot is supported by many world leaders, as well as international organizations such as the International Monetary Fund (IMF), the World Bank, and the World Trade Organization (WTO).

See also
Genetic pollution

References

External links 
 Full text at Internet Archive

English-language books
2007 non-fiction books
Books about war
Non-fiction books about diplomacy
Books about foreign relations of the United States